Beryozovka 1-ya is a rural locality (a khutor) and the administrative center of Beryozovskoye Rural Settlement, Novoanninsky District, Volgograd Oblast, Russia. The population was 698 as of 2010. There are 15 streets.

Geography 
Beryozovka 1-ya is located in steppe on the Khopyorsko-Buzulukskaya Plain, on the right bank of the Buzuluk River, 11 km northwest of Novoanninsky (the district's administrative centre) by road. Novoanninsky is the nearest rural locality.

References 

Rural localities in Novoanninsky District